Forman Christian College is a Private not-for-profit university liberal arts university in Lahore, Punjab, Pakistan. It was founded in 1864 and is administered by the Presbyterian Church. The university follows an American-style curriculum.

Founded in 1864 by American Presbyterian missionary Charles William Forman, the college was initially named Mission College, and changed its name in 1894 to Forman Christian College, in honor of its founder. Forman served as an associated college of the University of Calcutta until 1947 when it became affiliated with the University of Punjab. In 2004, the government granted it university charter hence providing it with degree awarding authority.

The college was initially based in the Rang Mahal in the Walled City of Lahore, which was leased by Charles with the support from foreign missions. In 1889, it was shifted to Napier Road and was inaugurated by  Henry Petty-Fitzmaurice, 5th Marquess of Lansdowne. Again, in 1940, the college was moved to its present campus on the banks of the Lahore Canal. The college remained financially autonomous until 1960 when the Pakistani government began annual grants for the college for its nursing program. The college was nationalized in 1972 and remained nationalized until 2003 when control was returned to the Presbyterian Church.

Forman is also known for its noted alumni and staff, including Nobel laureate Arthur Compton, former Indian Prime Minister I. K. Gujral, former Pakistani Presidents Farooq Leghari and Pervez Musharraf, diplomat Jamsheed Marker, journalist Kuldip Nayar, and activist Eqbal Ahmad. As of 2020, Forman was home to 8,435 students including 3,173 Intermediate students, 4,712 Baccalaureate students and 550 graduate students. It also has 220 full-time faculty members (more than 100 of whom have PhDs) as well as an alumni population of well over 21,000. Christians make up nearly 15% of the student body while the college runs a $1 million fund to finance scholarships for its students. As of 2016, the college has been ranked ninth highest in Pakistan among medium-sized universities and is the only institution in Pakistan which is a member of the Global Liberal Arts Alliance. Jonathan S. Addleton was inaugurated as the new Rector on October 31, 2020, following the retirement of his predecessor James A. Tebbe, who was awarded the Sitara-e-Imtiaz by the President of Pakistan; Tebbe was in turn was preceded by Peter H. Armacost who had previously served as president of Eckerd College in St. Petersburg, Florida.

History

Forman Christian College was founded in Lahore, British India by Presbyterian Christian missionary Charles William Forman as Rang Mahal School, a Christian mission school. Forman arrived in Calcutta in what was then colonial India in 1847 and, two years later, settled in Lahore, British India (now in Pakistan). The school added a college department in 1865 which later became a university in 2005 known as Forman Christian College University. It started offering an American-style world-class education in Pakistan. FCCU started new postgraduate courses along with MBA in 2007.

Native to Lahore, Surendra Kumar Datta was a professor of history and biology from 1909 to 1914 and served as the principal of Forman Christian College from 1932 to 1942, later becoming the president of the All India Conference of Indian Christians and representing the Christian community of colonial India in the Round Table Conferences.

One of Forman's faculty members, Prof. Arthur Compton, conducted the bulk of his research on cosmic rays at FCC University for which he received the Nobel Prize in 1927.

One of Professor Compton's former students Professor Piara Singh Gill taught at the college as lecturer in Physics between 1940 and 1947. Two alumni, Sir S. S. Bhatnagar and Bashir Ahmad, laid the foundation for scientific and industrial research in both parts of South Asia by establishing ICSIR and PCSIR respectively.

The first two Science graduates of FC College University were also the first Science graduates of the University of the Punjab (1900–1902). In this way FCCU was the first to establish, in this part of the sub-continent, Departments of Biology (1898), Greek, Latin and Hebrew Languages (1895–96), Industrial Chemistry (1917), Geography (1924), setting up the Experimental Psychology Laboratory, introducing the tutorial system (1908), appointing Deans of the Faculties introducing co-educational system (1902), and establishing an alumni Association (1896).
Besides this FCCU also started Software engineering, CS, and IT in 2006.

Achievements

Achievements of other Formanites, as the graduates are called, include:
 Its Principal J. C. R. Ewing was knighted for his services to humanity and education. He served as Vice Chancellor of the Punjab University for seven years.
 Formanite—alumnus and teacher of the college—Muhammad Yusuf Hashmi became the first Indian Principal of Madrasa 'Aliya in Calcutta, was recognized as an educator of distinction in British India and was titled Khan Bahadur by the British Crown. Later he was recognized in Pakistan also for his contributions to education and the Pakistan Movement.
 Principal C. H. Rice and a faculty member, Khairat M. Ibne Rasa, became Vice Chancellors of the Punjab University.
 Justice Sir Mian Abdur Rashid, who was a Formanite and also the first Chief Justice of Pakistan, administered the oath of office to Quaid-e-Azam Muhammad Ali Jinnah as the first Governor General.
 The English poet and scholar Alamgir Hashmi served as lecturer in English at Forman Christian College (early 1970s) and as faculty advisor to Folio.

Accreditation
The university has designed its four-year bachelor's degree program in accordance with the standards for accreditation in the U.S., and is seeking accreditation through the New England Commission of Higher Education (NECHE).

Commemorative stamp

Forman Christian College has received a commemorative postage stamp in the celebration of completing the successful 150 years. Issued by Pakistan Post, The stamp highlights a Sinclair Hall which was built to mark the centenary of FC College and was named after a devoted Principal Dr EJ Sinclair who served FCC for many years as a faculty member and Principal.

Notable alumni

Politicians
 Surendra Kumar Datta, president of the All India Conference of Indian Christians who represented the Indian Christian community in the Round Table Conferences
 Allama Mashriqi, mathematician, logician, political theorist, Islamic scholar and founder of the Khaksar movement
 Yousaf Raza Gillani, the 16th Prime Minister of Pakistan
 Shaukat Tarin, former Finance Minister of Pakistan
 Jahangir Khan Tareen, Pakistani politician and businessman.
 Inder Kumar Gujral, the 12th Prime Minister of India
 Parkash Singh Badal, chief minister of Indian Punjab several times and elected again in 2012.
 Mohammad Mian Soomro, former Chairman of the Senate of Pakistan, former caretaker Prime Minister & President of Pakistan.
 Malik Barkat Ali, former Punjabi Muslim League politician
 Shah Mehmood Qureshi, Foreign Minister of Pakistan and, the Vice Chairman of PTI
 Chaudhry Shujaat Hussain, former Prime Minister of Pakistan and current President of PML-Q
 Chaudhry Pervaiz Elahi, former Chief Minister of Punjab (Pakistan)
 Rao Sikandar Iqbal (1943–2010), former Defence Minister of Pakistan
 Farooq Leghari, former President of Pakistan.
 Syed Afzal Haider, former Pakistani law minister
 Balram Jakhar (1923–2016), an Indian politician, parliamentarian, and former Governor of Madhya Pradesh.
 Malik Muhammad Rafique Rajwana, Governor of Punjab.
 Kulsoom Nawaz Sharif, Wife of Mian Nawaz Sharif
 Pyare Lal Kureel, Indian politician, Dalit activist and Urdu poet

Bureaucrats and diplomats
 Roedad Khan, former Secretary General Ministry of Interior.
 Jamsheed Marker, United Nations Under-secretary General, Ambassador at Large of Pakistan (honorary doctorate)

Judiciary
 Justice (retired) Wajihuddin Ahmed, Former Candidate for Presidential Election against Pervaiz Musharraf, Former Supreme Court Judge
 Justice Sardar Muhammad Raza Khan, Former Chief Justice Peshawar High Court, Supreme Court of Pakistan Judge
 Sir Abdul Rasheed, First Chief Justice of Pakistan
 Justice (retired) Tassaduq Hussain Jillani, Former Chief Justice of Pakistan

Educators and scholars
 Kauser Abdulla Malik, secretary of the National Commission on Biotechnology.
 Eqbal Ahmad, post-colonial scholar and writer
 Ishtiaq Ahmed, Professor Emeritus of Political Science, Stockholm University and Honorary Senior Fellow, Institute of South Asian Studies, National University of Singapore
 Cecil Chaudhry, a decorated war hero, who served as the Principal of St. Anthony's College (Lahore)
 Mohini Maya Das, associate national secretary of the YWCA for India, Ceylon, and Burma
 Bipan Chandra, eminent historian
 Anwar Nasim, nuclear scientist and molecular biologist
 Georg Pfeffer (1943 — 2020), German anthropologist
 Rama Tirtha, Indian teacher of the Hindu philosophy of Vedanta
 Khan Bahadur Muhammad Yusuf Syed-Al-Hashmi, educator, mentor, reformer, All India Muslim League and Pakistan Movement leader
 Arfa Sayeda Zehra, Pakistani educationalist and Urdu language expert

Industry
 Chaudry Ahmed Saeed, CEO of Servis Industries
 Lord Paul, Swaraj Paul, founder and CEO of Caparo Group
 Sir Mohammad Pervaiz Anwer, Co-founder & Chairman, United Bank Limited.

Journalism
 Mushtaq Minhas, Provincial Minister for Information and Communication AJK Assembly, anchor of Bolta Pakistan on Geo TV
 Kuldip Nayar, Indian author and journalist

Literature and arts
 Anwar Kamal Pasha, pioneer Pakistani film director and producer.
 Krishan Chander, short story writer
 Mehr Lal Soni Zia Fatehabadi, Urdu poet
 Yawar Hayat Khan, senior producer/director of PTV
 Balwant Gargi, Punjabi playwright and author
 Harcharan Singh, Punjabi playwright and dramatist
 Shae Gill, singer

Armed forces
 Noel Israel Khokhar, General Officer Commanding 23rd Division and Major General of Pakistan Army
 Pervez Musharraf, former President of Pakistan, and former Chief of Army Staff of Pakistan Army
 Michael John O'Brian, O'Brian was the first Pakistan Air Force officer to serve as the Commandant of the National Defence University, Islamabad.

References

External links
 
 List of alumni
 Ewing Literary Society

 
Educational institutions established in 1864
1864 establishments in British India
Nationalisation in Pakistan